The Himalayan black bear (Ursus thibetanus laniger) is a subspecies of the Asian black bear found in the Himalayas of India, Bhutan, Nepal, China, and Pakistan.

Description
It is distinguished from U. t. thibetanus by its longer, thicker fur and smaller, whiter chest mark. During the summer, black bears can be found in warmer areas in Nepal, China, Bhutan, India and Tibet at altitudes of  up near the timberline.

Behaviour and ecology

Diet
They are omnivorous creatures (like most bears) and will eat just about anything. Their diet consists of acorns, nuts, fruit, honey, roots, and various insects such as termites and beetle larvae. If food is scarce, they may turn to eating livestock such as sheep, goats, and cattle.

Breeding
They reach sexual maturity at approximately three years. Mating occurs in October with usually two cubs born in February, while the mother is still hibernating. The offspring usually stay with their mother into the second year.

Status
This subspecies is listed as 'vulnerable' due to encroachment of human population, forest fires and the timber industries; these have all reduced the bear's habitat. There is also a high mortality rate among the newborn. And even though hunting of the black bear has been forbidden since 1977, there is still a large problem with poaching.

References

External links
 Himalayan black bear versus Bengal tiger at Jigme Dorji National Park, Bhutan

Asiatic black bears
Carnivorans of Asia
Mammals of India
Mammals of Pakistan
Mammals of Nepal